Level 9 may refer to:

Level 9 Computing, a software developer primarily known for their 1980s text adventures
Level 9 (TV series)
Level 9 (band)